Sumit Kaul (born 10 March 1978) is an Indian actor and voice actor known for playing Rajkumar Justin Maurya in Chakravartin Ashoka Samrat.

Kaul was born on March 10, 1978, in Bombay, Maharashtra into a Kashmiri Pandit family that left Kashmir Valley in the 1990s. He started his acting career in the year 2000 with Ek Jute, a theatre group headed by Nadira Babbar where he spent the next four years doing several Hindi and Urdu plays. He has also worked in the films like Haider, Laila Majnu, Mulk and Hamid and has been part of TV shows like Laagi Tujhse Lagan and web shows like Tanaav. His most recent role is of Nishant Sharma in Nazar on StarPlus.

Filmography

Films

Television

Dubbing roles

Animated series

Live action television series

Live action films

Hollywood films

Indian films

Animated films

See also
Dubbing (filmmaking)
List of Indian dubbing artists

References

External links

Kashmiri people
Indian Hindus
Kashmiri Hindus
Kashmiri Pandits
Indian people of Kashmiri descent
Indian male film actors
Indian male voice actors
Male actors in Hindi cinema
Indian male television actors
21st-century Indian male actors
1978 births

Living people